The 2011 Presbyterian Blue Hose football team represented Presbyterian College in the 2011 NCAA Division I FCS football season. The Blue Hose were led by third-year head coach Harold Nichols and played their home games at Bailey Memorial Stadium. They are a member of the Big South Conference. They finished the season 4–7, 3–3 in Big South play to finish in a tie for third place.

Schedule

References

Presbyterian
Presbyterian Blue Hose football seasons
Presbyterian Blue Hose football